96.7 Brigada News FM (DXVA 96.7 MHz) is an FM station owned and operated by Brigada Mass Media Corporation. Its studios and transmitter are located along R. Calo St., Brgy. Diego Silang, Butuan. The frequency is formerly owned by Nation Broadcasting Corporation from 1975 to 2004.

References

External links
Brigada News FM Butuan FB Page
Brigada News FM Butuan Website

Radio stations in Butuan
Radio stations established in 1975